Brigid Laffan is an Irish political scientist and Emeritus professor at Robert Schuman Centre for Advanced Studies at the European University Institute. Politico Europe ranked her among women who shape Europe in November 2018.

Education
Laffan graduated in 1977 from National Institute for Higher Education (NIHE).
After graduating, Laffan became a research co-ordinator at the College of Europe in Bruges.

Career
In 2013, Laffan joined the European University Institute in Florence, where she was appointed as Director of the Robert Schuman Centre for Advanced Studies. She retired from the role in August 2021. Laffan was previously Professor of European Politics in University College Dublin.
She spoke up about structural discrimination of women in academia.

Awards
Laffan has been awarded numerous awards for her professional achievements, including:
 UACES Lifetime Achievement Award in 2014
 THESEUS Award for outstanding research on European Integration in 2012
 Ordre national du Mérite by the President of France in 2010

Personal life
Laffan was married to the businessman Michael Laffan, whom she met as a student. They had three children. Her husband died tragically in January 2022.

Other activities
 European Policy Centre (EPC), Member of the Governing Council (since 2021) 
 Hertie School, Member of the Board of Trustees
 Royal Irish Academy, Member

References

Year of birth missing (living people)
Place of birth missing (living people)
Living people
Academics of University College Dublin
Irish political scientists
Women political scientists
Hertie School people
Academic staff of the European University Institute
Academic staff of the College of Europe
UACES award